Geldibuldu is a village in the Kâhta District, Adıyaman Province, Turkey. It had a population of 685 in 2021. The village is populated by Kurds of the Gewozî tribe.

The village is an ancient site dating back to the Hellenistic and Roman era including tombs, cemeteries and a bath house.

Geography 
Geldibuldu lies on the right bank of the Euphrates and around 30 km east of Kahta town and 60 km east of Adıyaman. It is surrounded by gardens and have several fountains in its vicinity.

See also 

 Tille Höyük

References 

Villages in Kâhta District
Kurdish settlements in Adıyaman Province
Ancient Greek archaeological sites in Turkey
Roman sites in Turkey